DXYK (99.7 FM), broadcasting as 99.7 Heat Radio, is a radio station. Its studio and transmitter are located along Mayor B. Atega St., Poblacion 10, Cabadbaran.

The station was formerly known as Campus Radio Butuan under Radio GMA from 1994 to 2010, when it closed shop due to lack of advertisers' support and financial problems.

References

Radio stations in Agusan del Norte
Radio stations established in 1994